John Edmund Amaratunga was a Ceylonese planter, lawyer and politician.

In October 1929 he enrolled at Lincoln's Inn and on 18 November 1933 was called to the bar as a barrister.

In 1939 he was appointed as the secretary of the Ceylon National Congress and the following years as treasurer.

He was elected to parliament at the 2nd parliamentary election held in May 1952, representing the United National Party in the Mirigama electorate. He defeated James Peter Obeyesekere III by 9,945 votes (securing 61% of the total vote).

He was unsuccessful in retaining seat at the 3rd parliamentary election held in April 1956, where he was defeated by 25,297 votes by the Sri Lanka Freedom Party candidate, Vimala Wijewardene.

References

Date of birth missing
Date of death missing
Members of the 2nd Parliament of Ceylon
Sinhalese businesspeople
Sinhalese lawyers
Sinhalese politicians
Ceylonese advocates
Sri Lankan barristers
Sri Lankan planters
Members of Lincoln's Inn
United National Party politicians